GIANTS Netball Academy is an Australian netball team that represents Netball New South Wales in the Australian Netball League. The team was originally formed in 2016 as a partnership between Netball ACT, Netball New South Wales and Giants Netball. Between 2017 and 2019 they played in the ANL  as Canberra GIANTS. They were grand finalists in 2018. In 2019, Netball ACT and Giants Netball ended their partnership and the latter relaunched the team as the Giants  Netball Academy. Netball ACT subsequently formed a new ANL team, Capital Darters.

History

Canberra Giants
In late 2016, Netball ACT, Netball New South Wales and Giants Netball formed a partnership in order to enter a team in the Australian Netball League. Canberra Giants subsequently replaced Canberra Darters as Netball ACT's ANL franchise. Between 2017 and 2019, Giants played in the ANL.  With a team captained by Taylah Davies and featuring Maddie Hay, Teigan O'Shannassy and Amy Parmenter, Giants reached the 2018 ANL grand final but lost to Tasmanian Magpies.

GIANTS Netball Academy
In September 2019 it was announced that Netball ACT, Netball New South Wales and Giants Netball had ended their partnership. It was also announced that Netball ACT and Giants Netball would be entering separate teams in the Australian Netball League from 2020. Netball New South Wales and Giants Netball subsequently launched the Giants Netball Academy. Netball ACT subsequently formed a new ANL team, Capital Darters.

ANL Grand finals

Home venues
During the 2019 ANL season Canberra Giants played their home matches at the SolarHub ACT Netball Centre and the Genea Netball Centre.

Notable players

2020 squad

  
 

Notes
  Toni Anderson, Latika Tombs, Matisse Letherbarrow, Clare Iongi and Claire O'Brien are training partners with Giants Netball.

Giants Netball
 Kiera Austin
 Taylah Davies
 Maddie Hay
 Teigan O'Shannassy
 Amy Parmenter

Head coaches

Premierships
Australian Netball League
Runners up: 2018: 1

References

Academy
Netball teams in Australia
Netball teams in Sydney
Australian Netball Championship teams
Sports clubs established in 2016
2016 establishments in Australia